Thackray is a surname and given name. Notable people with the name include:

Surname:
Arnold Thackray (born 1939), science historian, founding president of the Chemical Heritage Foundation
Charles Thackray (1877–1934), an English pharmacist and manufacturer of surgical instruments
Thackray Museum of Medicine, in Leeds, West Yorkshire, England
Emma-Jean Thackray, British bandleader, multi-instrumentalist, singer, DJ and producer
Gail Thackray (born 1964), British-born model, actress, adult-magazine publisher
Jake Thackray (1938–2002), English singer-songwriter, poet and journalist
Jamie Thackray, English rugby league footballer
Jane Thackray, basketball player
Jerry Thackray (born 1961), British music journalist and musician, who performs as Everett True
Kris Thackray (born 1988), English professional footballer

Given name:
John Thackray Bunce (1828–1899), British journalist and author

See also
 Thackery (disambiguation)
 Thackeray (disambiguation)
 Thackrey, a surname